The Birdwatchers' Field Club of Bangalore is a birdwatching club in Bangalore founded in the 1970s.

Activities 

The group has been active in conducting mid-winter waterfowl censuses. The club was also involved in a survey of wetlands around Bangalore in collaboration with the Forest Department of the Karnataka state and was involved in a comprehensive survey of water quality parameters including chemical, physical and biological status. The results of this survey helped in the creation of action plans for wetland conservation and have helped in highlighting the roles of wetlands in cities.

Meetups 

An informal organization, it meets every second Sunday of the month at 7:30 am in the Lalbagh Glass House. No membership fees or other formalities are needed to be a part of the group. Other trips happen at the Hebbal Lake on the 1st Sunday of every month at 7:30 am and near Bannerghatta National Park on the 3rd Sunday of every month at 6:30 am. Intimations for the trips are made on the email discussion group. 4th Sunday around Sarjapur.

Birds in the region 

Nearly 390 species of birds have been recorded from the Bangalore region of which around 186 species may be seen with ease.

Birding locations 

Some of the important birding locations in and around Bangalore include

Parks 
 Lal Bagh Botanical gardens - provides garden and wetland habitats
 Bannerghatta National Park - scrub and forest habitat (permission required)

Lakes and water bodies 
 Thippagondanahalli reservoir - (30 km away) deep water lake with open countryside (permission required)
 Hebbal Lake - wetland with numerous waterbirds, especially good in winter
 Puttenahalli Lake Lake - near Yelahanka - small waterbody with surprising birdlife
 Puttenahalli Lake - JP Nagar 7th Phase, near Brigade Millennium - maintained by Puttenahalli Neighbourhood Lake Improvement Trust

Others
 Nandi Hills - (50 km away) a good habitat for thrushes and forest birds
 Indian Institute of Science Campus (permission required)
 The Valley School - scrub and forest habitat (private property)
 UAS-GKVK campus - scrub and agricultural land (permission required)
 UAS-Hebbal campus - agricultural and garden land (permission required)
 Turahalli reserve forest
 Muninagara, Bannerghatta Outskirts
 Ragihalli, Bannerghatta Outskirts
 Shivanahalli, Bannerghatta Outskirts
 Gulakamale and TK falls

See also
 List of Bangalore birds

References

External links
Birds and Wildlife of Bangalore email discussion group
A list of the birds of Bangalore
Annotated Checklist of the birds of Bangalore (1994)
Birding in India
Birds of Karnataka

Further reading 

 

Ornithological organizations
Organisations based in Bangalore
Natural history of India
 
Organizations established in the 1970s
1970s establishments in Karnataka